Under Heaven Over Hell is the second studio album by Canadian rock band Streetheart, released in 1979. The band's covers of Under My Thumb (The Rolling Stones), and Here Comes the Night (Them), both charted in Canada. In December 1979, Under Heaven Over Hell was certified Platinum in Canada (in excess of 100,000 copies sold). This was the second and last Streetheart album to feature Matt Frenette after he left to join Paul Dean in Loverboy.

Track listing
All songs written by Streetheart unless otherwise noted.

 "Hollywood"  - 3:32
 "Main Street" (Paul Dean, Kenny Shields) - 3:47
 "Fight to Survive" - 3:48
 "Baby's Got a Gun - 3:16
 "Dreaded Dotted Line" (Daryl Gutheil, Shields, Dean) - 4:27
 "Star" - 3:53
 "Whose Turn Is It Tonight" (Dean, Shields, Matt Frenette) - 4:30
 "Here Comes the Night" (Bert Berns) - 3:49
 "Under My Thumb" (Jagger-Richards) - 6:38

Personnel

Streetheart

 Kenny Shields - lead vocals, percussion
 Ken "Spider" Sinnaeve - bass, backing vocals
 Daryl Gutheil - keyboards, backing vocals
 Matthew Frenette - drums, backing vocals
 John Hannah - guitar, backing vocals

Production

 Nick Blagona - engineer
 Gary Muth - executive producer
 Manny Charlton - producer

References

1979 albums
Streetheart (band) albums